Craig Russell may refer to:

 Craig Russell (Canadian actor) (1948–1990), female impersonator and actor
 Craig Russell (English actor) (born 1977)
 Craig L. Russell (born 1949), software architect
 Craig H. Russell (born 1951), American composer of classical music
 Craig Russell (British author) (born 1956), British-born novelist and short story writer
 Craig Russell (footballer) (born 1974), English football player
 P. Craig Russell (born 1951), American comic book writer, artist, and illustrator